The General Practice Data for Planning and Research system was set up by the British National Health Service as a replacement for the General Practice Extraction Service as a means of transmitting data intended for use beyond that of providing individual health care. This might include healthcare planning, or research.

It was announced on 21 May 2021,

It received a cautious welcome for the potential benefits to Health Research, particularly as large scale medical data is providing valuable data on the most effective treatments for Covid-19.

Privacy and implementation concerns 

Amongst patients and the general public concerns have been raised about sale of NHS data to private companies.

The Pulse magazine - distributed to general practitioners in the UK, carried articles reflecting concern about the scope of the data being collected and the additional workload and legal risks it would impose on GPs

Responsibility for informing patients was devolved to GP Practices, for example by updating the Privacy Notice on their website. Doctors urged a delay in introduction due to these concerns

Opt out 

Patients can out of NHS data sharing at two levels, firstly then can ask their GP not to share data with NHS digital for purposes of research and planning, called a Type 1 Opt Out, and secondly they can opt out of NHS Digital sharing - the National Data Opt Out.

The Type 1 Opt Out was implemented by the patient filling out a downloadable paper form and returning it to their GP,

Implementation delay 

The process of making GP data available to NHS Digital for wider use was due to begin on 1 July 2021, but was delayed until 1 September

It has now been delayed until four criteria have been met

 the ability to delete data if patients choose to opt-out of sharing their GP data with NHS Digital, even if this is after their data has been uploaded
 the backlog of opt-outs has been fully cleared
 a Trusted Research Environment has been developed and implemented in NHS Digital
 patients have been made more aware of the scheme through a campaign of engagement and communication

Data security and governance 

From the GP Data for Planning and Research: Letter from Parliamentary Under Secretary of State for Health and Social Care to general practices in England - 19 July 2021

References

External links 

 General Practice Data for Planning and Research (GPDPR)
 How to opt out | medConfidential
 use MY data - 94
 Our perspective on the new system for GP data | Understanding patient data
 OpenSAFELY: Home

Databases in England
Department of Health and Social Care
Medical databases in the United Kingdom